Maine elected its members September 8, 1826.  It required a majority for election, which was not met in the 7th district, requiring additional elections December 18, 1826, April 2, and September 27, 1827.

See also 
 1826 Maine's 5th congressional district special election
 1827 Maine's 1st congressional district special election
 1826 and 1827 United States House of Representatives elections
 List of United States representatives from Maine

Notes 

United States House of Representatives elections in Maine
Maine
Maine
United States House of Representatives
United States House of Representatives